Songwut Buapetch (born June 12, 1980), simply known as Wut, is a Thai retired professional footballer who played as a defender for Thai League 3 club Samut Sakhon.

Club career

External links
 Profile at Goal

1980 births
Living people
Songwut Buapetch
Songwut Buapetch
Association football defenders
Songwut Buapetch
Songwut Buapetch
Songwut Buapetch
Songwut Buapetch
Songwut Buapetch
Songwut Buapetch